The 2017 Seattle Mariners season was the 41st season in franchise history. The Mariners played their 18th full season (19th overall) at Safeco Field and finished with a record of 78–84.  They failed to qualify for the postseason, extending their drought to 16 years (having last qualified for the postseason in 2001). In addition to being the longest current streak in MLB, the drought became the longest currently in the four major North American professional sports when the National Football League's Buffalo Bills made it to the playoffs in December of that year.

Offseason and spring training

The Mariners added many players in a busy offseason, including pitchers Yovani Gallardo and Drew Smyly, and outfielder Jarrod Dyson.  Additionally, the team acquired shortstop Jean Segura and outfielder Mitch Haniger from the Arizona Diamondbacks in exchange for pitcher Taijuan Walker and shortstop Ketel Marte. Other players given up in trades included outfielder Seth Smith and pitcher Nate Karns. The team finished with a 19–14 win–loss record in preseason spring training, the second best record in the Cactus League. Their three ties are not included in the standings.

Regular season
On September 5, 2017, in a game against the Houston Astros, Ryan Garton became the 40th pitcher used by the Mariners in the 2017 season, tying the single-season record held by the 2014 Texas Rangers.

Game log

|-style=background:#fbb
| 1 || April 3 || @ Astros || 0–3 || Keuchel (1–0) || Hernández (0–1) || Giles (1) || 41,678 || 0–1 || L1
|-style=background:#fbb
| 2 || April 4 || @ Astros || 1–2 || McCullers Jr. (1–0) || Iwakuma (0–1) || Giles (2) || 21,406 || 0–2 || L2
|-style=background:#fbb
| 3 || April 5 || @ Astros || 3–5 (13) || Peacock (1–0) || De Jong (0–1) || — || 20,303 || 0–3 || L3
|-style=background:#bfb
| 4 || April 6 || @ Astros || 4–2 || Altavilla (1–0) || Giles (0–1) || Díaz (1)  || 18,362 || 1–3 || W1
|-style=background:#fbb
| 5 || April 7 || @ Angels || 1–5 || Chavez (1–0) || Gallardo (0–1) || — || 43,911 || 1–4 || L1
|-style=background:#fbb
| 6 || April 8 || @ Angels || 4–5 || Ramírez (2–0) || Scribner (0–1) || Bedrosian (2) || 42,668 || 1–5 || L2
|-style=background:#fbb
| 7 || April 9 || @ Angels || 9–10 || Bailey (2–0) || Díaz (0–1) || — || 37,175 || 1–6 || L3
|-style=background:#bfb
| 8 || April 10 || Astros || 6–0 || Paxton (1–0) || Morton (0–1) || — || 44,856 || 2–6 || W1
|-style=background:#fbb
| 9 || April 11 || Astros || 5–7 || Musgrove (1–0) || Miranda (0–1) || — || 18,527 || 2–7 || L1
|-style=background:#fbb
| 10 || April 12 || Astros || 5–10 || Peacock (2–0) || Altavilla (1–1) || — || 14,479 || 2–8 || L2
|-style=background:#bfb
| 11 || April 14 || Rangers || 2–1 || Hernández (1–1) || Leclerc (0–1) || Díaz (2)  || 41,855 || 3–8 || W1
|-style=background:#bfb
| 12 || April 15 || Rangers || 5–0 || Paxton (2–0) || Cashner (0–1) || — || 34,927 || 4–8 || W2
|-style=background:#bfb
| 13 || April 16 || Rangers || 8–7 || Díaz (1–1) || Dyson (0–3) || — || 19,678 || 5–8 || W3
|-style=background:#bfb
| 14 || April 17 || Marlins || 6–1 || Miranda (1–1) || Koehler (0–1) || — || 16,990 || 6–8 || W4
|-style=background:#fbb
| 15 || April 18 || Marlins || 0–5 || Chen (2–0) || Gallardo (0–2) || — || 16,126 || 6–9 || L1
|-style=background:#bfb
| 16 || April 19 || Marlins || 10–5 || Hernández (2–1) || Vólquez (0–2) || — || 27,147 || 7–9 || W1
|-style=background:#fbb
| 17 || April 20 || @ Athletics || 3–9 || Dull (1–1) || Scribner (0–2)  || — || 10,707 || 7–10 || L1
|-style=background:#fbb
| 18 || April 21 || @ Athletics || 1–3 || Manaea (1–1) || Iwakuma (0–2) || Casilla (3) || 15,255 || 7–11 || L2
|-style=background:#fbb
| 19 || April 22 || @ Athletics || 3–4 || Cotton (2–2) || Miranda (1–2) || Madson (1) || 20,722 || 7–12 || L3
|-style=background:#bfb
| 20 || April 23 || @ Athletics || 11–1 || Gallardo (1–2) || Triggs (3–1) || — || 24,165 || 8–12 || W1
|-style=background:#fbb
| 21 || April 25 || @ Tigers || 9–19 || Zimmermann (2–1) || Hernández (2–2) || — || 22,728 || 8–13 || L1
|-style=background:#bfb
| 22 || April 26 || @ Tigers || 8–0 || Paxton (3–0) || Norris (1–2) || — || 23,327 || 9–13 || W1
|-style=background:#bfb
| 23 || April 27 || @ Tigers || 2–1 || Zych (1–0) || Rodríguez (1–2) || Díaz (3) || 25,325 || 10–13 || W2
|-style=background:#bfb
| 24 || April 28 || @ Indians || 3–1 || Miranda (2–2) || Carrasco (2–2) || Díaz (4) || 20,842 || 11–13 || W3
|-style=background:#fbb
| 25 || April 29 || @ Indians || 3–4 || Salazar (2–2) || Gallardo (1–3) || Allen (6) || 21,221 || 11–14 || L1
|-style=background:#fbb
| 26 || April 30 || @ Indians || 4–12 || Tomlin (2–3) || De Jong (0–2) || — || 21,824 || 11–15 || L2
|-

|-style=background:#fbb
| 27 || May 2 || Angels || 4–6 (11) || Guerra (2–1) || Pazos (0–1) || — || 15,080 || 11–16 || L3
|-style=background:#bfb
| 28 || May 3 || Angels || 8–7 || Machi (1–0) || Parker (0–2) || Díaz (5) || 13,799 || 12–16 || W1
|-style=background:#bfb
| 29 || May 4 || Angels || 11–3 || Miranda (3–2) || Meyer (0–1) || — || 15,915 || 13–16 || W2
|-style=background:#fbb
| 30 || May 5 || Rangers || 1–3 (13) || Bush (2–0) || Pagan (0–1) || Claudio (1) || 26,938 || 13–17 || L1
|-style=background:#bfb
| 31 || May 6 || Rangers || 8–2 || Pazos (1–1) || Pérez (1–5) || — || 36,044 || 14–17 || W1
|-style=background:#bfb
| 32 || May 7 || Rangers || 4–3 || Rzepczynski (1–0) || Dyson (0–4) || Díaz (6) || 32,518 || 15–17 || W2
|-style=background:#bfb
| 33 || May 9 || @ Phillies || 10–9 || Vincent (1–0) || Neris (1–2) || Díaz (7) || 31,715 || 16–17 || W3
|-style=background:#bfb
| 34 || May 10 || @ Phillies ||11–6|| Zych (2–0) || Benoit (0–2) || — || 26,697 ||17–17||W4
|-style=background:#fbb
| 35 || May 11 || @ Blue Jays || 2–7 || Estrada (2–2) || De Jong (0–3) || — || 29,120 || 17–18 ||L1
|-style=background:#fbb
| 36 || May 12 || @ Blue Jays || 0–4 || Biagini (1–1) || Bergman (0–1) || — || 32,865 || 17–19 ||L2
|-style=background:#fbb
| 37 || May 13 || @ Blue Jays || 2–7 || Leone (1–0) || Vincent (1–1) || — || 42,346 || 17–20 ||L3
|-style=background:#fbb
| 38 || May 14 || @ Blue Jays || 2–3 || Tepera (3–1) || Díaz (1–2) || — || 42,030 || 17–21 ||L4
|-style=background:#bfb
| 39 || May 15 || Athletics || 6–5 || Gallardo (2–3) || Manaea (1–3) || Zych (1) || 15,431 || 18–21 ||W1
|-style=background:#fbb
| 40 || May 16 || Athletics || 6–9 || Madson (1–3) || Cishek (0–1) || — || 13,955 || 18–22 ||L1
|-style=background:#bfb
| 41 || May 17 || Athletics || 4–0 || Bergman (1–1) || Hahn (1–3) || — || 14,117 || 19–22 ||W1
|-style=background:#bfb
| 42 || May 18 || White Sox || 5–4 || Vincent (2–1) || Jennings (2–1) || — || 17,757 || 20–22 ||W2
|-style=background:#fbb
| 43 || May 19 || White Sox || 1–2 (10) || Robertson (3–1) || Zych (2–1) || — || 32,371 || 20–23 ||L1
|-style=background:#fbb
| 44 || May 20 || White Sox || 1–16 || Pelfrey (1–4) || Gallardo (2–4) || — || 33,801 || 20–24 || L2
|-style=background:#fbb
| 45 || May 21 || White Sox || 1–8 || Holland (4–3) || Heston (0–1) || — || 36,782 || 20–25 || L3
|-style=background:#fbb
| 46 || May 23 || @ Nationals || 1–10 || Ross (2–0) ||  Bergman (1–2) || — || 29,650 || 20–26 || L4
|-style=background:#fbb
| 47 || May 24 || @ Nationals || 1–5 || Roark (4–2) ||  Gaviglio (0–1) || — || 29,223|| 20–27 || L5
|-style=background:#bfb
| 48 || May 25 || @ Nationals || 4–2 || Miranda (4–2) ||  Turner (2–3) || Díaz (8) || 18,881 || 21–27 || W1
|-style=background:#fbb
| 49 || May 26 || @ Red Sox || 0–3 || Rodríguez (4–1) || Gallardo (2–5) || Kimbrel (13) || 35,080 || 21–28 || L1
|-style=background:#fbb
| 50 || May 27 || @ Red Sox || 0–6 || Johnson (2–0) || Whalen (0–1) || — || 36,985 || 21–29 || L2
|-style=background:#bfb
| 51 || May 28 || @ Red Sox || 5–0 || Bergman (2–2) || Porcello (3–6) || — || 37,174 || 22–29 || W1
|-style=background:#bfb
| 52 || May 29 || @ Rockies || 6–5 || Gaviglio (1–1) || Chatwood (4–7) || Díaz (9) || 40,298 || 23–29 ||W2
|-style=background:#bfb
| 53 || May 30 || @ Rockies || 10–4 || Miranda (5–2) || Anderson (3–5) || — || 33,258 || 24–29 ||W3
|-style=background:#bfb
| 54 || May 31 || Rockies || 5–0 || Paxton (4–0) || Senzatela (7–2) || — || 16,750 || 25–29 ||W4
|-

|-style=background:#fbb
| 55 || June 1 || Rockies || 3–6 || Freeland (6–3) || Gallardo (2–6) || Holland (20) || 21,536 || 25–30 ||L1
|-style=background:#bfb
| 56 || June 2 || Rays || 12–4 || Bergman (3–2) || Odorizzi (3–3) || — || 27,933 || 26–30 ||W1
|-style=background:#bfb
| 57 || June 3 || Rays || 9–2 || Gaviglio (2–1) || Cobb (4–5) || — || 26,995 || 27–30 ||W2
|-style=background:#bfb
| 58 || June 4 || Rays || 7–1 || Miranda (6–2) || Ramírez (3–1) || — || 28,579 || 28–30 ||W3
|-style=background:#bfb
| 59 || June 6 || Twins || 12–3 || Paxton (5–0) || Santiago (4–6) || — || 18,166 || 29–30 ||W4
|-style=background:#bfb
| 60 || June 7 || Twins || 6–5 || Díaz (2–2) || Kintzler (2–1) || — || 15,732 || 30–30 ||W5
|-style=background:#fbb
| 61 || June 8 || Twins || 1–2 || Gibson (3–4) || Bergman (3–3) || Kintzler (16) || 15,621 || 30–31 || L1
|-style=background:#bfb
| 62 || June 9 || Blue Jays || 4–2 || Cloyd (1–0) || Biagini (1–5) || Díaz (10)|| 33,518 || 31–31 || W1
|-style=background:#fbb
| 63 || June 10 || Blue Jays || 2–4 || Stroman (7–2) || Zych (2–2) || Osuna (15) || 45,480 || 31–32 || L1
|-style=background:#fbb
| 64 || June 11 || Blue Jays || 0–4 || Happ (1–4) || Paxton (5–1) || Osuna (16) || 41,137 || 31–33 || L2
|-style=background:#bfb
| 65 || June 12 || @ Twins || 14–3 || Gallardo (3–6) || Mejía (1–2) || — || 16,996 || 32–33 ||W1
|-style=background:#fbb
| 66 || June 13 || @ Twins || 7–20 || Gibson (4–4) || Bergman (3–4) || — || 17,922 || 32–34 || L1
|-style=background:#bfb
| 67 || June 14 || @ Twins || 6–4 || Gaviglio (3–1) || Santana (8–4) || Díaz (11) || 22,283 || 33–34 ||W1
|-style=background:#fbb
| 68 || June 15 || @ Twins || 2–6 || Berríos (6–1) || Miranda (6–3) || — || 24,464 || 33–35 ||L1
|-style=background:#fbb
| 69 || June 16 || @ Rangers || 4–10 || Ross (1–0) || Paxton (5–2) || — || 33,960 || 33–36 || L2
|-style=background:#fbb
| 70 || June 17 || @ Rangers || 4–10 || Pérez (3–6) || Gallardo (3–7) || — || 35,928 || 33–37 || L3
|-style=background:#bfb
| 71 || June 18 || @ Rangers || 7–3 || Bergman (4–4) || Darvish (6–5) || — || 31,552 || 34–37 || W1
|-style=background:#bfb
| 72 || June 19 || Tigers || 6–2 || Pazos (2–1) || A. Wilson (1–4) || — || 21,517 || 35–37 || W2
|-style=background:#bfb
| 73 || June 20 || Tigers || 5–4 (10) || Cishek (1–1) || J. Wilson (3–3) || — || 15,063 || 36–37 || W3
|-style=background:#bfb
| 74 || June 21 || Tigers || 7–5 || Zych (3–2) || Greene (1–1) || Díaz (12) || 18,526 || 37–37 || W4
|-style=background:#bfb
| 75 || June 22 || Tigers || 9–6 || Moore (1–0) || Norris (4–5) || Cishek (1) || 18,736 || 38–37 ||W5
|-style=background:#bfb
| 76 || June 23 || Astros || 13–3 || Hernández (3–2) || Musgrove (4–7) || Gallardo (1) || 31,783 || 39–37 ||W6
|-style=background:#fbb
| 77 || June 24 || Astros || 2–5 || McCullers (7–1) || Gaviglio (3–2) || — || 29,820 || 39–38 ||L1
|-style=background:#fbb
| 78 || June 25 || Astros || 2–8 || Feliz (3–1) || Miranda (6–4) || — || 33,010 || 39–39 || L2
|-style=background:#fbb
| 80 || June 27 || Phillies || 2–8 || Nola (5–5) || Paxton (5–3) || — || 22,648 || 39–40 || L3
|-style=background:#fbb
| 79 || June 28 || Phillies || 4–5 || Pinto (1–0) || Díaz (2–3) || Neris (7) || 29,505 || 39–41 || L4
|-style=background:#bfb
| 81 || June 30 || @ Angels || 10–0 || Miranda (7–4) ||  Bridwell (2–1) || — || 40,059 || 40–41 || W1
|-

|-style=background:#fbb
| 82 || July 1 || @ Angels || 0–4 || Nolasco (4–9) || Gaviglio (3–3) || — || 44,644 || 40–42 || L1
|-style=background:#bfb
| 83 || July 2 || @ Angels || 5–3 || Paxton (6–3) || Chavez (5–9) || Díaz (13) || 39,279 || 41–42 || W1
|-style=background:#fbb
| 84 || July 3 || Royals || 1–3 || Kennedy (3–6) || Moore (1–1) || Soria (1) || 35,789 || 41–43 || L1
|-style=background:#fbb
| 85 || July 4 || Royals || 3–7 || Duffy (5–4) || Hernández (3–3) ||—|| 25,555 || 41–44 || L2
|-style=background:#fbb
| 86 || July 5 || Royals || 6–9 (10) || Minor (7–5) || Pazos (2–2) || Herrera (19) || 15,157 || 41–45 || L3
|-style=background:#fbb
| 87 || July 6 || Athletics || 4–7 || Blackburn (1–0) || Gaviglio (3–4) || — || 18,368 || 41–46 || L4
|-style=background:#bfb
| 88 || July 7 || Athletics || 7–2 || Paxton (7–3) || Manaea (7–5) || — || 22,213  || 42–46 || W1
|-style=background:#fbb
| 89 || July 8 || Athletics || 3–4 || Doolittle (1–0) || Díaz (2–4) || Casilla (15) || 28,694 || 42–47 || L1
|-style=background:#bfb
| 90 || July 9 || Athletics || 4–0 || Hernández (4–3) || Gossett (1–4) || — || 32,661 || 43–47 ||W1
|- style="text-align:center; background:#bbcaff;"
| colspan="10" | 88th All-Star Game in Miami, Florida
|-style=background:#bfb
| 91 || July 14 || @ White Sox || 4–2 || Paxton (8–3) || Shields (2–2) || Díaz (14) || 20,311 || 44–47 ||W2
|-style=background:#bfb
| 92 || July 15 || @ White Sox || 4–3 || Hernández (5–3) || Swarzak (4–3) || Díaz (15) || 21,743 || 45–47 || W3
|-style=background:#bfb
| 93 || July 16 || @ White Sox || 7–6 (10) || Vincent (3–1) || Beck (1–1) || Díaz (16) || 24,502 || 46–47 || W4
|-style=background:#bfb
| 94 || July 17 || @ Astros || 9–7 (10) || Gallardo (4–7) || Sipp (0–1) || Díaz (17) || 24,701 || 47–47 ||W5
|-style=background:#fbb
| 95 || July 18 || @ Astros || 2–6 || Peacock (8–1) || Gaviglio (3–5) || Gregerson (1) || 27,111 || 47–48 ||L1
|-style=background:#bfb
| 96 || July 19 || @ Astros || 4–1 || Paxton (9–3) || Morton (7–4) || Díaz (18) || 35,191 || 48–48 ||W1
|-style=background:#fbb
| 97 || July 20 || Yankees || 1–4 || Severino (6–4) || Hernández (5–4) || — || 35,175 || 48–49 ||L1
|-style=background:#fbb
| 98 || July 21 || Yankees || 1–5 || Sabathia (9–3) || Moore (1–2) || — || 34,073 || 48–50 || L2
|-style=background:#bfb
| 99 || July 22 || Yankees || 6–5 (10) || Zych (4–2) || Warren (2–2) || — || 46,197 || 49–50 || W1
|-style=background:#fbb
| 100 || July 23 || Yankees || 4–6 || Green (1–0) || Pazos (2–3)  || Chapman (11) || 38,503 || 49–51 || L1
|-style=background:#bfb
| 101 || July 24 || Red Sox || 4–0 || Paxton (10–3) || Rodríguez (4–3) || — || 29,262 || 50–51 || W1
|-style=background:#bfb
| 102 || July 25 || Red Sox || 6–5 (13) || Zych (5–2) || Fister (0–5) || — || 28,992 || 51–51 || W2
|-style=background:#fbb
| 103 || July 26 || Red Sox || 0–4 || Sale (13–4) || Moore (1–3) || Kimbrel (25) || 39,797 || 51–52 || L1
|-style=background:#fbb
| 104 || July 28 || Mets || 5–7 || Blevins (5–0) || Phelps (2–5) || Reed (19) || 34,543 || 51–53 || L2
|-style=background:#bfb
| 105 || July 29 || Mets || 3–2 || Gallardo (5–7) || deGrom (12–4) || Díaz (19) || 33,519 || 52–53 || W1
|-style=background:#bfb
| 106 || July 30 || Mets || 9–1 || Paxton (11–3) || Lugo (5–3) || — || 31,162 || 53–53 ||W2
|-style=background:#bfb
| 107 || July 31 || @ Rangers || 6–4 || Phelps (3–5) || Claudio (2–1) || Díaz (20) || 22,294 || 54–53 ||W3
|-

|-style=background:#bfb
| 108 || August 1 || @ Rangers || 8–7 || Lawrence (1–3) || Martinez (3–4) || Díaz (21) || 21,200 || 55–53 ||W4
|-style=background:#fbb
| 109 || August 2 || @ Rangers || 1–5 || Cashner (7–8) || Miranda (7–5) || — || 23,041 || 55–54 ||L1
|-style=background:#fbb
| 110 || August 3 || @ Royals || 4–6 || Buchter (4–3) || Pagan (0–2) || Herrera (24) || 29,228 || 55–55 ||L2
|-style=background:#bfb
| 111 || August 4 || @ Royals || 5–2 || Paxton (12–3) || Hammel (5–9) || Díaz (22) || 38,130 || 56–55 || W1
|-style=background:#bbbbbb
| – || August 5 || @ Royals || colspan=7 | PPD, RAIN; Rescheduled for August 6
|-style=background:#bfb
| 112 || August 6 || @ Royals || 8–7 || Pazos (3–3) || Duffy (7–7) || Díaz (23) ||  || 57–55 ||W2
|-style=background:#fbb
| 113 || August 6 || @ Royals || 1–9 || Junis (4–2) || Ramírez (4–4) || — || 29,432 || 57–56 || L1
|-style=background:#bfb
| 114 || August 8 || @ Athletics || 7–6 (10) || Rzepczynski (2–0) || Smith (2–1) || Díaz (24) || 12,354 || 58–56 ||W1
|-style=background:#bfb
| 115 || August 9 || @ Athletics || 6–3 || Pagan (1–2) || Cotton (5–9) || Diaz (25) || 14,989 || 59–56 ||W2
|-style=background:#fbb
| 116 || August 10 || Angels || 3–6 || Norris (2–5) || Diaz (2–5) || Bedrosian (4) || 35,021 || 59–57 ||L1
|-style=background:#fbb
| 117 || August 11 || Angels || 5–6 || Middleton (3–0) || Pazos (3–4) || Petit (2) || 38,206 || 59–58 ||L2
|-style=background:#fbb
| 118 || August 12 || Angels || 3–6 || Middleton (4–0) || Zych (5–3) || Bedrosian (5) || 45,388 || 59–59 ||L3
|-style=background:#fbb
| 119 || August 13 || Angels || 2–4 || Bridwell (7–1) || Miranda (7–6) || Middleton (2) || 43,199 || 59–60 ||L4
|-style=background:#fbb
| 120 || August 14 || Orioles || 3–11 || Gausman (9–8) || Gallardo (5–8) || — || 17,973 || 59–61 ||L5
|-style=background:#bfb
| 121 || August 15 || Orioles || 3–1 || Albers (1–0) || Miley (6–10) || Díaz (26) || 24,927 || 60–61 ||W1
|-style=background:#bfb
| 122 || August 16 || Orioles || 7–6 || Zych (6–3) || Jiménez (5–8) || Rzepczynski (1) || 33,448 || 61–61 ||W2
|-style=background:#bfb
| 123 || August 18 || @ Rays || 7–1 || Ramírez (5–4) || Pruitt (6–4) || — || 11,501 || 62–61 || W3
|-style=background:#bfb
| 124 || August 19 || @ Rays || 7–6 || Miranda (8–6) || Odorizzi (6–7) || Díaz (27) || 12,218 || 63–61 || W4
|-style=background:#fbb
| 125 || August 20 || @ Rays || 0–3 || Snell (2–6) || Gallardo (5–9) || Colomé (36) || 13,354 || 63–62 || L1
|-style=background:#bfb
| 126 || August 21 || @ Braves || 6–5 || Albers (2–0) || Foltynewicz (10–9) || Díaz (28) || 21,284 || 64–62 || W1
|-style=background:#fbb
| 127 || August 22 || @ Braves || 0–4 || Sims (2–3) || Gonzales (0–1) || — || 22,947 || 64–63 || L1
|-style=background:#bfb
| 128 || August 23 || @ Braves || 9–6 || Phelps (4–5) || Johnson (6–3) || Díaz (29) || 23,890 || 65–63 || W1
|-style=background:#bfb
| 129 || August 25 || @ Yankees || 2–1 (11) || Pazos (4–4) || Chapman (4–3) || Díaz (30) || 42,057 || 66–63 || W2
|-style=background:#fbb
| 130 || August 26 || @ Yankees || 3–6 || Gray (8–8) || Gallardo (5–10) || Betances (10) || 39,810 || 66–64 || L1
|-style=background:#fbb
| 131 || August 27 || @ Yankees || 1–10 || Tanaka (10–10) || Albers (2–1) || — || 40,112 || 66–65 || L2
|-style=background:#fbb
| 132 || August 28 || @ Orioles || 6–7 || Hart (2–0) || Pagan (1–3) || Britton (12) || 15,106 || 66–66 || L3
|-style=background:#fbb
| 133 || August 29 || @ Orioles || 0–4 || Bundy (13–8) || Ramírez (5–5) || — || 13,736 || 66–67 || L4
|-style=background:#fbb
| 134 || August 30 || @ Orioles || 7–8 || Brach (4–4) || Bergman (4–5) || Britton (13) || 16,983 || 66–68 || L5
|-

|-style=background:#bfb
| 135 || September 1 || Athletics || 3–2 || Leake (8–12) || Manaea (9–9) || Díaz (31) || 19,030 || 67–68 ||W1
|-style=background:#bfb
| 136 || September 2 || Athletics || 7–6 || Díaz (3–5) || Treinen (1–4) || — || 22,245 || 68–68 ||W2
|-style=background:#bfb
| 137 || September 3 || Athletics || 10–2 || Albers (3–1) || Gossett (3–8) || — || 26,898 || 69–68 ||W3
|-style=background:#fbb
| 138 || September 4 || Astros || 2–6 || Keuchel (12–3) || Rzepczynski (2–1) || — || 20,108 || 69–69 || L1
|-style=background:#fbb
| 139 || September 5 || Astros || 1–3 || Verlander (11–8) || Pazos (4–5) || Giles (29) || 14,568 || 69–70 || L2
|-style=background:#fbb
| 140 || September 6 || Astros || 3–5 || Devenski (8–3) || Díaz (3–6) || — || 15,104 || 69–71 || L3
|-style=background:#bfb
| 141 || September 8|| Angels || 4–3 || Leake (9–12) || Nolasco (6–13) || Díaz (32) || 21,396 || 70–71 ||W1
|-style=background:#bfb
| 142 || September 9 || Angels || 8–1 || Albers (4–1) || Heaney (1–2) || — || 26,248 || 71–71 ||W2
|-style=background:#fbb
| 143 || September 10 || Angels || 3–5 || Bedrosian (6–4) || Vincent (3–2) || Petit (3) || 20,094 || 71–72 ||L1
|-style=background:#fbb
| 144 || September 11 || @ Rangers || 3–5 || Hamels (10–3) || Miranda (8–7) || Claudio (8) || 20,686 || 71–73 || L2
|-style=background:#bfb
| 145 || September 12 || @ Rangers || 10–3 || Gonzales (1–1) || González (7–11) || — || 20,557 || 72–73 || W1
|-style=background:#bfb
| 146 || September 13 || @ Rangers || 8–1 || Leake (10–12) || Pérez (12–11) || — || 23,083 || 73–73 || W2
|-style=background:#bfb
| 147 || September 14 || @ Rangers || 10–4 || Albers (5–1) || Cashner (9–10) || — || 21,931 || 74–73 ||W3
|-style=background:#fbb
| 148 || September 15 || @ Astros || 2–5 || Morton (12–7) || Paxton (12–4) || Giles (31) || 28,328 || 74–74 ||L1
|-style=background:#fbb
| 149 || September 16 || @ Astros || 6–8 || Keuchel (13–4) || Ramírez (5–6) || Musgrove (1) || 33,650 || 74–75 ||L2
|-style=background:#fbb
| 150 || September 17 || @ Astros || 1–7 || Verlander (13–8) || Moore (1–4) || — || 30,247 || 74–76 || L3
|-style=background:#fbb
| 151 || September 19 || Rangers || 1–3 || Barnette (2–1) || Vincent (3–3) || Claudio (9) || 17,251 || 74–77 || L4
|-style=background:#fbb
| 152 || September 20 || Rangers || 6–8 || Cashner (10–10) || Hernández (5–5) || Claudio (10) || 15,962 || 74–78 || L5
|-style=background:#fbb
| 153 || September 21 || Rangers || 2–4 || Hamels (11–4) || Paxton (12–5) || Kela (2) || 14,849 || 74–79 || L6
|-style=background:#bfb
| 154 || September 22 || Indians || 3–2 || Diaz (4–6) || Allen (3–7) || — || 27,462 || 75–79 || W1
|-style=background:#fbb
| 155 || September 23 || Indians || 4–11 || Carrasco (17–6) || Moore (1–5) || – || 31,565 || 75–80 || L1
|-style=background:#fbb
| 156 || September 24 || Indians || 2–4 || Kluber (18–4)  || Leake (10–13) || Allen (29) || 23,695 || 75–81 || L2
|-style=background:#bfb
| 157 || September 25 || @ Athletics || 7–1 || Hernandez (6–5) || Gossett (4–10) || Albers (1) || 9,329 || 76–81 || W1
|-style=background:#bfb
| 158 || September 26 || @ Athletics || 6–3 || Pagan (2–3) || Mengden (2–2) || Diaz (33) || 13,513 || 77–81 || W2
|-style=background:#fbb
| 159 || September 27 || @ Athletics || 5–6 || Treinen (3–6) || Simmons (0–1) || — || 13,132 || 77–82 || L1
|-style=background:#fbb
| 160 || September 29 || @ Angels || 5–6 || Wood (3–4) || Rzepczynski (2–2) || Parker (8) || 35,106 || 77–83 || L2
|-style=background:#bfb
| 161 || September 30 || @ Angels || 6–4 || Lawrence (2–3) || Bedrosian (6–5) || Díaz (34) || 38,075 || 78–83 || W1
|-style=background:#fbb
| 162 || October 1 || @ Angels || 2–6 || Bridwell (10–3) || Simmons (0–2) || — || 34,940 || 78–84 || L1
|-

|-
| Legend:       = Win       = Loss       = PostponementBold = Mariners team member

Standings

American League West

American League Wild Card

Record against opponents

Roster

Statistics

Batting

Players in bold are on the active MLB roster as of 2022.

Note: G = Games played; AB = At bats; R = Runs; H = Hits; 2B = Doubles; 3B = Triples; HR = Home runs; RBI = Runs batted in; SB = Stolen bases; BB = Walks; K = Strikeouts; AVG = Batting average; OBP = On-base percentage; SLG = Slugging percentage; TB = Total bases

Pitching

Players in bold are on the active MLB roster as of 2022.

Note: W = Wins; L = Losses; ERA = Earned run average; G = Games pitched; GS = Games started; SV = Saves; IP = Innings pitched; H = Hits allowed; R = Runs allowed; ER = Earned runs allowed; BB = Walks allowed; K = Strikeouts

Farm system

References

External links
Seattle Mariners Official Site 
2017 Seattle Mariners season at Baseball Reference

Seattle Mariners seasons
Seattle Mariners season
Seattle Mariners
Seattle Mariners